Polo is among those contested at the Summer Olympic Games, and was held five times between 1900 and 1936. Equine events began at the Olympics in 1900, when competitions in polo and other equestrian events (considered by the International Olympic Committee (IOC) to be separate sports) were held. 

Among the contestants were 87 men from nine countries. The youngest participant was 21-year-old Roberto Cavanagh from Argentina, while the oldest was 52-year-old Justo San Miguel of Spain. The top country medal winner was Great Britain with six medals. No equestrian had more than two medals, but four riders, all from Great Britain, won two medals each. In 1900, at the first appearance of the sport, all medals went to "mixed teams", while in the second appearance at the 1908 Games, all medals went to British teams.

References
General
 
 

Specific

Polo
 Medalists
Olympic medallists
Medallists